Timothy Leo O'Shannessey  (born 14 June 1972) is an Australian cyclist. He won the bronze medal in Men's team pursuit in the 1996 Summer Olympics.

At the 1994 Commonwealth Games in Victoria, Canada, O'Shannessey won a gold medal in the team pursuit and a bronze medal in the 1000–metre time trial.

Prior to the 2000 Sydney Olympics, O'Shannessey was suspended for two years after returning a high testosterone level.

References 

1972 births
Living people
Cyclists at the 1996 Summer Olympics
Olympic bronze medalists for Australia
Olympic cyclists of Australia
Olympic medalists in cycling
Medalists at the 1996 Summer Olympics
Commonwealth Games gold medallists for Australia
Commonwealth Games bronze medallists for Australia
Cyclists at the 1994 Commonwealth Games
Doping cases in Australian cycling
Commonwealth Games medallists in cycling
Australian male cyclists
Medallists at the 1994 Commonwealth Games